Daniel Mustard EP is the debut EP from the singer-songwriter, Daniel 'Homeless' Mustard. This is the first set of original content from Daniel after a video of him covering Radioheads song Creep on The Opie and Anthony Show went viral on YouTube. The EP was produced by James Bertuzzi and the artwork done by Pascal Coffez.

Track listing 
All songs written and performed by Daniel Mustard

  Impulse to my Addiction
  Rats Racing
  One Day at a Time
  Do Without
  Evacuating to Mars

Personnel 
Daniel Mustard: Guitar, Vocals 
Hap Pardo: Guitar 
Paul Alves: Bass 
Judd Nielson: Keyboards 
James Bertuzzi: Drums and Percussion 
Matt Dickey: Guitar 
Kathryn Holtkamp: Background Vocals

References 

2010 EPs